Barlig, officially the Municipality of Barlig  is a 5th class municipality in the province of Mountain Province, Philippines. According to the 2020 census, it has a population of 4,796 people.

Geography
Barlig is bounded in the east by Natonin in the west by Bontoc and Sadanga. In the north, it is bounded by Tinglayan and in the south by the town of Mayoyao. The town is separated into three settlements or cluster of villages such as Barlig town proper, Lias and Kadaclan.

Barangays
Barlig is politically subdivided into 11 barangays. These barangays are headed by elected officials: Barangay Captain, Barangay Council, whose members are called Barangay Councilors. All are elected every three years.

Chupac
Fiangtin
Kaleo
Latang
Lias Kanluran
Lias Silangan
Lingoy
Lunas
Macalana
Ogoog
Gawana (Poblacion)

Climate

Barlig has an oceanic climate (Köppen climate classification Cfb) closely bordering a subtropical highland climate ("Cwb") with relatively dry winters.

Demographics

The people of Barlig are predominantly of Igorot and Ilocano descent. Locals call themselves Ifiallig which is a reference to someone born or having roots from villages. In the cluster of villages in Lias, people call themselves I-lias while those from Kadaclan villages call themselves Ekachakran. Despite living in a single town, the people speak different languages and probably traditions.

The town of Barlig is home to two indigenous languages, the Finalig language and the Balangaw language. Both languages are on the brink of extinction, making them important languages in the field of language conservation. The two languages are also important for the survival of the Finalig culture and the Balangaw culture, respectively.

Economy

Government
Barlig, belonging to the lone congressional district of the province of Mountain Province, is governed by a mayor designated as its local chief executive and by a municipal council as its legislative body in accordance with the Local Government Code. The mayor, vice mayor, and the councilors are elected directly by the people through an election which is being held every three years.

Elected officials

Members of the Municipal Council (2019–2022):
 Congressman: Maximo Y. Dalog Jr.
 Mayor: Clark C. Ngaya
 Vice-Mayor: David Osborn M. Fomocod
 Councilors:
 Delio F. Focad
 Johnson A. Ingson
 Rolly S. Agyao
 Benjamin G. Sapguian
 Rodrigo C. Layao
 Abner P. Ayoga
 Fernando Y. Cablog
 Rodrigo S. Awe

Tourism
Barlig town boasts of its own rice terraces, the Barlig Rice Terraces in the near the center of the town and Lias Rice Terraces in the Lias, which is a cluster of villages. In Kadaclan, which is another cluster of villages, the annual Menaliyam festival is held. Its most popular destination is Mt. Amuyao which stands at more than 2,702 meters above sea level. That makes it one of the highest mountains in the Philippines and the fourth highest mountain in Luzon.

Notable personalities 
Jeyrick Sigmaton - actor and model

References

External links

 [ Philippine Standard Geographic Code]
Philippine Census Information

Municipalities of Mountain Province